Sunnyvale is a city located in the Santa Clara Valley in northwest Santa Clara County in the U.S. state of California.

Sunnyvale lies along the historic El Camino Real and Highway 101 and is bordered by portions of San Jose to the north, Moffett Federal Airfield and NASA Ames Research Center to the northwest, Mountain View to the northwest, Los Altos to the southwest, Cupertino to the south, and Santa Clara to the east.

Sunnyvale's population was 155,805 at the 2020 census, making it the second most populous city in the county (after San Jose) and the seventh most populous city in the San Francisco Bay Area.

As one of the major cities that make up California's high-tech area known as Silicon Valley, Sunnyvale is the birthplace of the video game industry, former location of Atari headquarters, and the location of a fictional computer game company in the 1983 film WarGames. Many technology companies are headquartered in Sunnyvale and many more operate there, including several aerospace/defense companies.

Sunnyvale was also the home to Onizuka Air Force Station, often referred to as "the Blue Cube" due to the color and shape of its windowless main building. The facility, previously known as Sunnyvale Air Force Station, was named for the deceased Space Shuttle Challenger astronaut Ellison Onizuka.  It served as an artificial satellite control facility of the U.S. military until August 2010 and has since been decommissioned and demolished.

Sunnyvale is one of the few U.S. cities to have a single unified Department of Public Safety, where all personnel are trained as firefighters, police officers, and EMTs, so that they can respond to an emergency in any of the three roles.

Library services for the city are provided by the Sunnyvale Public Library, located at the Sunnyvale Civic Center.

History

When the Spanish first arrived in the 1770s at the Santa Clara Valley, it was heavily populated by the Ohlone Native Americans. However early on with the arrival of the Spaniards, smallpox, measles and other new diseases greatly reduced the Ohlone population. In 1777, Mission Santa Clara was founded by Franciscan missionary Padre Junipero Serra and was originally located in San Jose (near what is now the San Jose International Airport runway).

1800s

In 1843, Rancho Pastoria de las Borregas was granted to Francisco Estrada and his wife Inez Castro. Portions of the land given in this grant later developed into the cities of Mountain View and Sunnyvale. Two years later, in 1844, another land grant was provided to Lupe Yñigo, one of the few Native Americans to hold land grants. His land grant was first called Rancho Posolmi, named in honor of a village of the Ohlone that once stood in the area. Rancho Posolmi was later known as Rancho Ynigo.

Martin Murphy Jr. came to California with his father as part of the Stephens-Townsend-Murphy Party in 1844. In 1850, Martin Murphy Jr. bought a piece of Rancho Pastoria de las Borregas for $12,500. Murphy established a wheat farm and ranch named Bay View. Murphy had the first wood-frame house in Santa Clara County; it was shipped from New England. The house was demolished in 1961 but was reconstructed in 2008 as the Sunnyvale Heritage Park Museum. When he died in 1884, his land was divided among his heirs.

In 1860, The San Francisco and San Jose Rail Road was allowed to lay tracks on Bay View and established Murphy Station. Lawrence Station was later established on the southern edge of Bay View.

In the 1870s, small fruit orchards replaced many large wheat farms, because wheat farming turned uneconomical due to county and property tax laws, imports and soil degradation. In 1871, Dr. James M. Dawson and his wife Eloise (née Jones) established the first fruit cannery in the county. Fruit agriculture for canning soon became a major industry in the county. The invention of the refrigerated rail car further increased the viability of an economy based upon fruit. The fruit orchards became so prevalent that in 1886, the San Jose Board of Trade called Santa Clara County the "Garden of the World".

In the 1880s, Chinese workers made up roughly one third of the farm labor in Santa Clara County. This percentage reduced over time after the Chinese Exclusion Act was passed. In the following decade, the 1890s, many immigrants from Italy, the Azores, Portugal, and Japan arrived to work in the orchards.

In 1897, Walter Everett Crossman bought 200 acres (809,000 m2) and began selling real estate. He advertised the area as "Beautiful Murphy" and later, in the 1900s, as "the City of Destiny". Also in 1897, Encinal School opened as the first school in Murphy. Previously, children in the town had to travel to Mountain View for school.  The area also became known as Encinal.

1900s
In 1901, the residents of Murphy were informed they could not use the names Encinal or Murphy for their post office.   Sunnyvale was given its current name on March 24, 1901. It was named Sunnyvale as it is located in a sunny region adjacent to areas with significantly more fog.

Sunnyvale continued to grow and in 1904, dried fruit production began. Two years later, Libby, McNeill & Libby, a Chicago meat-packing company, decided to open its first fruit-packing factory in Sunnyvale. Today, a water tower painted to resemble the first Libby's fruit cocktail can label identifies the former site of the factory.

Also in 1906, the Joshua Hendy Iron Works relocated from San Francisco to Sunnyvale after the company's building was destroyed by fire after the 1906 earthquake. The ironworks was the first non-agricultural industry in the town. The company later switched from producing mining equipment to other products such as marine steam engines.

In 1912, the residents of Sunnyvale voted to incorporate, and Sunnyvale became an official city.

Fremont High School first opened in 1923.

In 1924, Edwina Benner was elected to her first term as mayor of Sunnyvale. She was the second female mayor in the history of the state of California.

In 1930, Congress decided to place the West Coast dirigible base in Sunnyvale after "buying" the  parcel of farmland bordering the San Francisco Bay from the city for $1.

This naval airfield was later renamed Naval Air Station Moffett and then Moffett Federal Airfield and is commonly called Moffett Field.

In 1939, the National Advisory Committee for Aeronautics (NACA, the forerunner of NASA) began research at Ames Laboratory.

During World War II, the war economy began a change from the fruit industry to the high-tech industry in Santa Clara County. The Joshua Hendy Iron Works built marine steam engines, naval guns and rocket launchers to aid in the war effort. As the defense industry grew, a shortage of workers in the farm industry was created. Immigrants from Mexico came to Sunnyvale to fill this void of workers.

Following the war, the fruit orchards and sweetcorn farms were cleared to build homes, factories and offices.

In 1950 the volunteer fire department and the paid police department were combined into the department of public safety.

In 1956, the aircraft manufacturer Lockheed moved its headquarters to Sunnyvale.

Since then, numerous high-tech companies have established offices and headquarters in Sunnyvale, including Advanced Micro Devices and Yahoo.

The first prototype of Atari's coin-operated Pong, the first successful video game, was installed in Sunnyvale in August 1972 in a bar named Andy Capp's Tavern, now Rooster T. Feathers. Atari's headquarters were located at 1196 Borregas Avenue in north Sunnyvale.

By 2002, the few remaining orchards had been replaced with homes and shops. However, there are still city-owned orchards, such as the Heritage Orchard next to the Sunnyvale Community Center.

In 1979, an indoor mall called Sunnyvale Town Center opened in what used to be a traditional downtown shopping district. After years of successful operation, the mall started to decline in the 1990s. After numerous changes in plans and ownership, the mall was demolished in 2007.

2000s
Sunnyvale celebrated its one-hundredth anniversary on August 25, 2012.

Downtown development

In November 2009, previously closed portions of the main streets in downtown Sunnyvale were reopened as part of the ongoing downtown redevelopment of the Sunnyvale Town Center mall, marking the first time in over three decades that those street blocks have been open to vehicle and pedestrian traffic. Part of the project involved building new apartment buildings, however during the Great Recession the property was repossessed by Wells Fargo in 2009; the developer countersued, leaving the project in legal limbo through 2015.

The two office buildings are now fully occupied by Uber. Mixed-use developments have been built at the former Town and Country location near the Plaza del Sol just north of Murphy Avenue. By mid 2015, new multistory apartment complexes had opened, including a number of ground-floor businesses, and the lawsuit against Wells Fargo was resolved in the bank's favor. The development was sold to Sares Regis in late 2016. Redwood Square reopened as a park in 2017. Many apartments are occupied, and more are being completed in 2020.  A Whole Foods Market and AMC Theatres multiplex opened in October 2020.

Major businesses
In the 2010s, Sunnyvale became home to operations from numerous major technology companies including Apple, LinkedIn (now headquartered in Sunnyvale), Google, Walmart Labs, and 23andMe. Google in particular has announced major development plans in the Moffett Park area, adjacent to Moffett Field.

Geography

Its elevation is 130 feet above sea level.

Climate
Like most of the San Francisco Bay Area, Sunnyvale has a Mediterranean climate (Köppen Csb), with cool, moist winters and  warm, very dry summers. Average daytime summer temperatures are in the high 70s, and during the winter, average daytime high temperatures rarely stay below . Snowfall is rare, but on January 21, 1962, and February 5, 1976, measurable snowfall occurred in Sunnyvale and most of the San Francisco Bay Area. Sunnyvale was briefly hit by tornadoes  in 1951 and 1998, but otherwise they are extremely rare.

Demographics

The 2010 United States Census reported that Sunnyvale had a population of 140,081. The racial makeup of Sunnyvale was 60,193 (43.0%) White, 2,735 (2.0%) African American, 662 (0.5%) Native American, 57,320 (40.9%) Asian, 638 (0.5%) Pacific Islander, 12,177 (8.7%) from other races, and 6,356 (4.5%) from two or more races. Hispanic or Latino of any race were 26,517 persons (18.9%). Non-Hispanic Whites were 34.5% of the population in 2010, compared to 74.7% in 1980.

The Census reported that 139,232 people (99.4% of the population) lived in households, 380 (0.3%) lived in non-institutionalized group quarters, and 469 (0.3%) were institutionalized.

There were 53,384 households, out of which 18,614 (34.9%) had children under the age of 18 living in them, 28,583 (53.5%) were opposite-sex married couples living together, 4,629 (8.7%) had a female householder with no husband present, 2,341 (4.4%) had a male householder with no wife present. There were 2,386 (4.5%) unmarried opposite-sex partnerships, and 357 (0.7%) same-sex married couples or partnerships. 13,457 households (25.2%) were made up of individuals, and 3,775 (7.1%) had someone living alone who was 65 years of age or older. The average household size was 2.61. There were 35,553 families (66.6% of all households); the average family size was 3.15.

The population was spread out, with 31,435 people (22.4%) under the age of 18, 9,350 people (6.7%) aged 18 to 24, 50,919 people (36.3%) aged 25 to 44, 32,721 people (23.4%) aged 45 to 64, and 15,656 people (11.2%) who were 65 years of age or older. The median age was 35.6 years. For every 100 females, there were 101.5 males. For every 100 females age 18 and over, there were 100.9 males.

The homeowner vacancy rate was 1.1%; the rental vacancy rate was 4.4%. 68,895 people (49.2% of the population) lived in owner-occupied housing units and 70,337 people (50.2%) lived in rental housing units.

Economy

Companies based in Sunnyvale include Infinera, Fortinet, Intuitive Surgical, Juniper Networks, LinkedIn, Proofpoint, Inc., and Trimble Inc.

Largest employers
According to the city's 2021 Comprehensive Annual Financial Report, the top employers in the city are:

Government and politics
The City of Sunnyvale uses the council–manager form of government, with a city council consisting of seven members elected to fill individual seats. Starting in November 2020, the mayor is directly elected to a four-year term in a city-wide election. The six council members are elected to four year terms from six districts in even-year elections.  The vice-mayor is selected from the six city council members by the mayor and city council, serving a one-year term. The city council hires a city manager to run the day-to-day operations of the city government.

Sunnyvale is the largest city in the United States that uses a consolidated department of public safety, with sworn officers who are fully cross-trained to perform police, firefighting, and emergency medical services. Officer assignments are rotated annually, with some specialist assignments lasting up to five years. Sunnyvale has had a consolidated DPS since 1950.

As of August 16, 2016, Sunnyvale had 56,030 registered voters.

Education
For elementary and middle schools, most of the city is in the Sunnyvale School District, while some parts are in the Cupertino Union School District, the Santa Clara Unified School District, and the Mountain View Whisman Elementary School District.

For high schools, most of the city is in the Fremont Union High School District (the parts that are part of the Sunnyvale School District or Cupertino Union School District for primary schools), and those areas of Sunnyvale are divided between Fremont High School and Homestead High School. Some parts of the city are in the Santa Clara Unified School District.

French American School of Silicon Valley (FASSV) is a private elementary school in Sunnyvale, which opened in 1992. It is recognized as a French international school by the AEFE.

Neighborhoods

The southern half of Sunnyvale is predominantly residential, while most of the portion of Sunnyvale north of Highway 237 is zoned for industrial use.

Within this southern half are several neighborhoods that account for a large number of Eichler homes throughout residential Sunnyvale. More specifically, there are 16 housing tracts containing over 1100 Eichler homes.

The far eastern section of El Camino Real in Sunnyvale has a significant concentration of businesses owned by Indian immigrants.

Parks

There are 476 acres of parks in the Sunnyvale area. These include Las Palmas Park, Ortega Park, Seven Seas Park, Washington Park near downtown, two public golf courses, and Baylands Park, site of the annual Linux Picnic.

Charles Street Gardens, Sunnyvale's oldest and largest community garden, is located adjacent to Sunnyvale's Public Library. In 2017 the Santa Clara Unified School District took over operation of Full Circle Farm Sunnyvale, which leased the land from the district, and plan to focus the farm on education.

Transportation

Several major roads and freeways go through Sunnyvale:
 Interstate 280 (Junipero Serra Freeway)
 U.S. Route 101
 State Route 82 (El Camino Real)
 State Route 85 (Stevens Creek Freeway)
 State Route 237 (Southbay Freeway)

Public transportation
Sunnyvale is served by Santa Clara Valley Transportation Authority (light rail and buses) and by Caltrain commuter rail. Two Caltrain stations are located in Sunnyvale:  the Sunnyvale station in the Heritage District downtown, and the Lawrence station in eastern Sunnyvale, north of the Ponderosa neighborhood.

Bicycle
Sunnyvale has been listed by the League of American Bicyclists as a bronze-level Bicycle Friendly Community.

The Bicycle and Pedestrian Advisory Committee advises the city council on the continued development of the bicycle plan for the city.

Airports

For commercial passenger air travel, Sunnyvale is served by three nearby international airports:

 Norman Y. Mineta San Jose International Airport (SJC), 9.5 miles from downtown Sunnyvale by car. It is also accessible by Caltrain, VTA light rail, and VTA bus.  Caltrain and light rail stations require a transfer to a free shuttle bus to get to the airport terminal.
 San Francisco International Airport (SFO), 27.7 miles by car. SFO is transit accessible from Sunnyvale via Caltrain and Bay Area Rapid Transit (BART).
 Metropolitan Oakland International Airport (OAK), 37.5 miles by car. Access to Oakland airport by public transit is possible via multiple transfers.

Crime
Sunnyvale has consistently ranked as one of the safest ten cities (for cities of similar size) in the United States according to the FBI's crime reports. From 1966 to at least 2004, Sunnyvale never placed below fifth in safety rankings among U.S. cities in its population class. In 2005, Sunnyvale ranked as the 18th-safest city overall in the U.S., according to the Morgan Quitno Awards. In 2009, Sunnyvale was ranked 7th in U.S. by Forbes Magazine in an analysis of America's safest cities. In 2018, Sunnyvale was named the safest city by SmartAsset.com for the third year in a row.

Gangs
According to Sunnyvale's Department of Public Safety, confirmed gang members make up less than one percent of the population, although 95% of the crime is gang on gang violence. Sunnyvale's Gang Task-force agency as well as the FBI note three main gangs that exist in Sunnyvale, thrice allying to either Sureño or Norteño families, one existing since the 1960s.

1988 ESL Shooting
On February 16, 1988, Richard Farley shot 11 people, killing 7, at his former employer ESL Incorporated in north Sunnyvale, across Borregas Avenue from Atari. The 1993 made-for-television film I Can Make You Love Me starring Brooke Shields and Richard Thomas was based on the event.

Folklore
A long-standing legend of Sunnyvale is of a ghost that haunts the town's Toys 'R' Us store (now REI). A purported psychic, Sylvia Browne, claimed to have made contact with the ghost on the 1980 TV show That's Incredible! and named him Johnny Johnson. This story was also explored in a 1991 episode of Haunted Lives: True Ghost Stories. Browne stated that he had been a Swedish preacher who worked as a farm hand in the orchard where the toy store now stands and that he bled to death from an accidental, self-inflicted axe injury to his leg.

Notable people

Twin towns – sister cities
Until 1970, Sunnyvale had a Sister City relationship with Chillán, Chile. In 2013, the city entered into a three-year Friendly Exchange Relations Agreement with Iizuka, Japan; in July 2016 the city council voted to change this to a Sister City relationship.

See also

List of cities and towns in the San Francisco Bay Area
:Category: People from Sunnyvale, California

References

External links

 
 
 Sunnyvale Sun

 
1912 establishments in California
Cities in Santa Clara County, California
Cities in the San Francisco Bay Area
Incorporated cities and towns in California
Populated coastal places in California
Silicon Valley
Populated places established in 1912